Azizur Rahman (26 September 1943 – 18 August 2020) was a Bangladesh Awami League politician and a 2-term Jatiya Sangsad member representing the Moulvibazar-3 constituency. He received the 2020 Independence Day Award by the government of Bangladesh.

Career
Rahman was elected to parliament from Moulvibazar-3 as a Bangladesh Awami League candidate in 1986. He was again elected from Moulvibazar-3 as a Bangladesh Awami League candidate in 1991. He was a parliamentary whip and a joint general secretary of the Awami League central Committee. At the time of his death Rahman was the Chairman of Moulvibazar Zila Parishad.

Death 
Rahman died on 18 August 2020 in Bangabandhu Sheikh Mujib Medical University Hospital, due to COVID-19 during the COVID-19 pandemic in Bangladesh.

References 

1943 births
2020 deaths
Awami League politicians
3rd Jatiya Sangsad members
5th Jatiya Sangsad members
Recipients of the Independence Day Award
Deaths from the COVID-19 pandemic in Bangladesh